MSC Fantasia is a Fantasia-class cruise ship owned and operated by MSC Cruises and serves as the lead vessel for the Fantasia class of ships. She entered service in December 2008 and ushered in a new generation of larger ships for MSC Cruises, becoming the largest ship to operate for MSC at the time of delivery.  She was also the first vessel to feature the MSC Yacht Club, MSC Cruises ship within ship concept.

History

Planning and construction 
In June 2005, unconfirmed reports first emerged that claimed MSC had signed a letter of intent with STX France for two post-Panamax ships set to debut in 2008 and 2009. STX France did confirm that the new 1,600-cabin and 4,000-passenger prototype for the ships was being finalized and considered. On 16 November 2005, MSC finalized a $1.2 billion two-ship order with STX France for what would be the largest ships in the fleet at the time of their delivery. The vessels were planned to be at 135,500 GT each, with a maximum guest capacity of 3,887 passengers, accompanied by 1,300 crew.

The first of the two ships, known as A33, began construction with a steel-cutting ceremony at the shipyard in Saint-Nazaire, France on 9 September 2006.  She was floated out from the shipyard on 1 March 2008. The ship left to perform her sea trials for 48 hours in the Bay of Biscay on 24 October 2008 and returned on 27 October 2008.

Delivery and christening 
She left the shipyard for the last time on 10 December 2008 and was officially delivered to MSC thereafter. From France, the ship sailed her first voyage headed for Naples for her christening via Lisbon, Gibraltar, Alicante, Barcelona, and Marseille. She was officially named on 18 December 2008 by her godmother, Sophia Loren.

Operational career
Following her christening, MSC Fantasia spent her inaugural season cruising from Genoa. Her inaugural cruise departed on 20 December 2008 for the Eastern Mediterranean, calling in Rhodes, Alexandria, Messina, and Naples. She then cruised round-trip Canary Islands and Western Mediterranean itineraries.

On 5 March 2009, high winds snapped the forward mooring lines of MSC Fantasia while she was docked in Spain. The bow drifted away from the dock side and caused a passenger gangway to collapse into the water. One passenger and three crew members had to be rescued from the sea. One passenger was taken to hospital with head injuries, while the other three were treated for hypothermia.

MSC Fantasia has also cruised beyond Europe and has been deployed to sail in the Caribbean from Guadeloupe and Martinique during the winter months. Between 2019 and 2021, MSC Fantasia cruised  in South America in the fall and winter before returning to Europe in the summer. In summer 2021, she cruised weekly Mediterranean itineraries from Genoa in the place of MSC Seashore until 1 August, because Seashore's delivery was postponed due to construction delays caused by the COVID-19 pandemic.

Design and specifications 
The ship's electric motors come from Converteam, which drive the propellers located aft of two Becker Marine System flap rudders and stern thrusters.

Facilities include a spa, a 4D cinema, musical fountains, and a race car simulator.

References

Notes

Bibliography

External links

Official MSC Fantasia website

 

Fantasia
Ships built in France
2008 ships